Paul Feeley (July 27, 1910 − June 10, 1966) was an artist and director of the Art Department at Bennington College during the 1950s and early 1960s.

Overview
Though Feeley was born in the same generation as the Abstract Expressionists, his mature style was hardly gestural; instead, according to Feeley, his paintings "just sat still and had a presence rather than some sort of an agitated fit." His greatest source of admiration was the Great Pyramids in Egypt. Gene Baro stated that Feeley's mature style did not overtly depend on any contemporary art movements of the time. His paintings are best summarized as follows:

Biography
In 1931, Feeley moved to New York to pursue his studies. He studied portrait painting with Cecilia Beaux, figure painting with George Bridgeman and Thomas Hart Benton, and mural painting from 1931-1934. In fact, in 1934, Feeley joined the Mural Painters Society of New York and became increasingly engaged with mural projects. From 1934-1939, he would teach at the Cooper Union, where he'd later become the head of industrial design. In 1940, he would join the staff at Bennington College, where he was fundamental in establishing its art department. Aside from a brief hiatus from 1943-1946, when he volunteered for service with the United States Marines, he remained committed to the art of his contemporaries, he exposed his students — Helen Frankenthaler among them — to many of the most significant artists of his time. He helped to organize the first retrospective exhibition of modernist sculptor David Smith, in 1951  and helped with the 1955 Hans Hofmann and the 1952 Jackson Pollock retrospectives which were both organized by Clement Greenberg. Feeley and Greenberg also organized a Kenneth Noland Exhibition at Bennington in 1961.

Feeley was also an important Color Field painter and in the early 1960s he was included in the catalog and exhibition called Post-Painterly Abstraction organized by Clement Greenberg in 1964. Feeley had his first full scale retrospective (held posthumously) at the Matthew Marks Gallery, 2002 in New York City. In 2015 and 2016, the Albright Knox Art Gallery and Columbus Museum of Art held his first museum retrospective, titled "Imperfections by Chance: Paul Feeley Retrospective, 1956-1966."

Artistic style
His paintings are characterized by bright colors; simple, abstract forms; and symmetrically arranged, but serene, compositions. Clement Greenberg included Feeley’s work in his exhibition Emerging Talent at the Kootz Gallery in 1954, alongside other Color-Field painters like Morris Louis and Kenneth Noland. Critics have argued that his work is distinct from Color Field painting in its classical rigor and forms, whether derived from ancient Greek and Moorish decorative patterns or Cycladic and Egyptian statues. Art critic Gene Baro argued that the Color Field classification was in certain ways inappropriate. He saw Feeley's work as something wholly independent and not dialectically related to the Abstract Expressionist legacy - "in the way that Baroque art is remote from ancient Egyptian art and presumes different standards of value and habits of mind."

Paul Feeley’s early style has been compared to that of the Abstract Expressionists. It was gestural, the painter’s hand was evident, many colors were present on the canvas at one time, and there was an overall abstraction of form. Lawrence Campbell, writing in 1955, described his paintings as “blobs elbowing each other and being rained on;” in one painting in particular Campbell described, “a strange red blob on a green ground successfully not looking like anything but itself.” This is his infamous “Red Blotch” from 1954. Feeley himself saw this painting as a breakthrough: “So I suppose the reason that I can see that red and green picture as significant has to do with the absence of all those textural variations and all that brush dynamism. I suppose in fact I just placed it, and didn’t do anything about the dynamic brush work, rather allowed the paint just to sit there. With the red and green picture, I think I just sensed the shape of the canvas as an event, as against the notion of the canvas creating an arena for events.” At this point, his focus shifts away from paintings that project themselves onto their viewers and towards paintings that bring you in.

By 1960, Feeley was known for his use of unprimed canvas. His style had also tightened up significantly, favoring clean lines and geometric forms over the more popular Pollock-inspired gestural style. By this time, he had cut down on surface variations in his paintings to avoid light reflecting on different patches of paint. Lawrence Alloway, in an interview with Feeley, recollects how Feeley described this change as “getting away from the madness, too much dynamic energy, of the earlier style.” At the same time, his use of color was also simplified, favoring only two to three colors per canvas. Writing in 1960, Campbell explained the dichotomy present in Feeley’s paintings: “On the one hand, they are simple. On the other, they suggest complicated theories, ideas and emotions.” He also suggests that Feeley’s forms are biomorphic, suggestive of “tiny living things greatly magnified.”

Donald Judd reviewed a Paul Feeley show at Betty Parsons Gallery in 1962. Judd noted how Feeley had improved his canvas staining technique: “Also, as before, both bright colors are stained into unprimed canvas. This time the colors are opaque, fully intense and definitely opposed, and the edges are unbled, harder and often stressed by a narrow line of canvas.” These improvements clearly impressed Judd, who stated “The paintings are stronger than before and thorough…The greater scale, not size, since the painting is smaller than several others, adds considerable force and abstraction…The new scale makes the forms and the rectangle of the work more nearly identical, makes the painting more autonomous and exclusive.”

In the early to mid 1960s, Feeley continued to perfect his forms. He makes greater use of negative space, isolating his quatrefoil and dumbbell shaped forms in the center of the canvas. Judd explained how his paintings contained a “peculiar ornateness” that struck a balance between “being easily identified as ornate and Moorish and being thought something more new and interesting.”

One of Feeley’s last developments before his untimely death, was his three dimensional wood structures. Lucy R. Lippard wrote, “These works in painted plywood are all based on the round cornered square with curved-in sides that has been a familiar feature of his art for some time now. Interlocking multiples of this form severely order the space around them, engaging a far greater amount of surrounding territory than ought to be possible by the right-angled intersection of two thin planes.”

Exhibitions

Paul Feeley was a veteran of more than 18 solo exhibitions in important contemporary galleries and dozens of group exhibitions in important museums. During the late 1950s through the mid-1960s he was represented by the Tibor de Nagy Gallery, and then the Betty Parsons Gallery in New York City where he had nine solo exhibitions. He also had exhibitions of his paintings and sculpture in London at the Kasmin Gallery and at the Nicholas Wilder Gallery in Los Angeles.

Recently, he has been the feature of solo shows at the Jablonka Galerie, 2006; Lawrence Markey, 2007; the Bennington Museum, 2008; the Matthew Marks Gallery, 2008 and Garth Greenan Gallery, 2012 and 2016. In 2015 and 2016, the Albright Knox Art Gallery and Columbus Museum of Art held his first museum retrospective, titled "Imperfections by Chance: Paul Feeley Retrospective, 1956-1966." Feeley’s work is held in major museum collections around the world including the Museum of Modern Art, the Whitney Museum of American Art, and the Solomon R. Guggenheim Museum.

Solo exhibitions
1950
Paul Feeley, Stanford Research Institute, Menlo Park, California, March
 
1951
Paul Feeley, Alexandre Rabow Galleries, San Francisco, August
 
1953
Paul Feeley, Cummington School of the Arts, Cummington, Massachusetts, July–August
Paul Feeley, Milton College, Milton, Wisconsin, October 9–11
 
1955
Paul Feeley, Tibor de Nagy Gallery, New York, October 4–22
 
1957
Paul Feeley, Bennington College Art Gallery, Bennington, Vermont, March 31–April 6
 
1958
Paintings by Paul Feeley, Tibor de Nagy Gallery, New York, February 18–March 8
 
1960
Paul Feeley: Paintings, Betty Parsons Gallery, New York, May 16–June 4
 
1962
Paul Feeley: Paintings, Betty Parsons Gallery, New York, May 14–June 2
 
1963
Paul Feeley: Paintings, Betty Parsons Gallery, New York, May 13–31
 
1964
Paul Feeley: Paintings, Betty Parsons Gallery, New York, October 27–November 21
Paul Feeley: Recent Paintings, Kasmin Gallery, London, October 30–November 28
 
1965
Paul Feeley: Sculpture, Betty Parsons Gallery, New York, December 7–31
 
1966
Paul Feeley, Nicholas Wilder Gallery, Los Angeles, January 18–February 12
Paul Feeley: Paintings and Sculpture Never Before Shown, Betty Parsons Gallery, New York, November 1–26
 
1968
Paul Feeley (1910–1968): A Memorial Exhibition, Solomon R. Guggenheim Museum, New York, April 1–May 26
 
1968–1971
Paul Feeley: Retrospective Exhibition of Drawings and Watercolors, 1927–1966, New Gallery, Bennington College, Bennington, Vermont, April 15–May 4, 1968; Andrew Dickson White Museum of Art, Cornell University, Ithaca, New York, January 4–February 2, 1969; Akron Art Institute, February 22–May 11, 1969; Saginaw Art Museum, Saginaw, Michigan, September 6–October 5, 1969; University Center, University of Tennessee, Knoxville, October 25–November 23, 1969; Munson-Williams-Proctor Arts Institute, Utica, New York, December 14–January 11, 1970; Hunter Gallery of Art, Chattanooga, Tennessee, January 31–March 1, 1970; University Gallery, University of Minnesota, March 21–April 19, 1970; Museum of Art, University of Iowa, Iowa City, August 15–September 13, 1970; Santa Barbara Museum of Art, October 3–November 1, 1970; University Art Museum, University of New Mexico, Albuquerque, January 9– February 7, 1971; Kutztown State College, Kutztown, Pennsylvania, October 30–November 28, 1971
 
1970
Paul Feeley: A Selection from the Late 1950s Paintings, Betty Parsons Gallery, New York, March 10–28
 
1971
Paul Feeley: Drawings and Watercolors, Betty Parsons Gallery, New York, October 26–November 13
 
1973
Paul Feeley, Andrew Crispo Gallery, New York, August 15–September 15
 
1975
Paul Feeley: Paintings, First Show of These Paintings in This Country, Betty Parsons Gallery, New York, January 7–25
 
1976
Paul Feeley, André Emmerich Gallery, New York, February 21–March 11
 
1997
Paul Feeley: Works on Paper, Lawrence Markey Gallery, New York, September 20–November 1
 
1999
Paul Feeley: Paintings, Lawrence Markey Gallery, New York, April 20–May 29
 
2002
Paul Feeley: Painting and Sculpture, Lawrence Markey Gallery and Matthew Marks Gallery, New York, October 5–November 23
 
2005–2006
Paul Feeley: Paintings and Watercolors, Jablonka Galerie, Cologne, February 3, 2005 – March 18, 2006
 
2007
Paul Feeley: Paintings, Lawrence Markey Gallery, San Antonio, November 6–December 14
 
2008
Paul Feeley: Nine Paintings, Matthew Marks Gallery, New York, September 13–October 25
Paul Feeley: Bennington College, 75 Years of Arts Education, Bennington Museum, Bennington, Vermont, February 2–March 25
 
2013
Paul Feeley: Paintings, Lawrence Markey Gallery, San Antonio, April 5–May 10
Paul Feeley: 1957–1962, Garth Greenan Gallery, New York, September 5–October 12
 
2014–2016
Imperfections by Chance: Paul Feeley Retrospective, 1954–1966, Albright-Knox Art Gallery, Buffalo, November 9, 2014 – February 15, 2015; Columbus Museum of Art, October 25, 2015—January 10, 2016

2016
Paul Feeley: An Artist's Game with Jacks, Garth Greenan Gallery, New York, April 7−May 14

Group exhibitions
1949
New England Painting and Sculpture, 1949, Institute of Contemporary Art, Boston, May 4–28
 
1950
Art Faculty Exhibition, Bennington College Art Gallery, Bennington, Vermont, November 13–27
 
1951
Paintings by Ellwood Graham, Watercolors by Paul Feeley, San Francisco Museum of Art, February 6–25
Art Faculty Exhibition, Bennington College Art Gallery, Bennington, Vermont, October
 
1952
Art Faculty Exhibition, Bennington College Art Gallery, Bennington, Vermont, June
 
1954
Emerging Talent, Kootz Gallery, New York, January 11–30
 
1955
Vanguard 1955: A Painter’s Selection of New American Paintings, Walker Art Center, Minneapolis, October 23–December 5
 
1957
Bennington College Art Faculty Exhibition, Robert Hull Fleming Museum, Burlington, Vermont, January
 
1959
Group Show, Section Eleven, New York, March 31– April 6
 
1961
Exhibition of Work by the Art Faculty, Bennington College Art Gallery, Bennington, Vermont, October 6–28
64th American Exhibition: Paintings, Sculpture, Art Institute of Chicago, January 6–February 5
 
1962
Four American Painters, Molton Gallery, London, April 26–May 19
Painting and Sculpture, Wolfson Studio, Salt Point, New York, August 19–September 21
A Selection of American Abstract Paintings, 1948–1962, Newton College of the Sacred Heart, Newton, Massachusetts, November
 
1963
New Experiments in Art, De Cordova Museum, Lincoln, Massachusetts, March 23–April 28
First Annual Retrospective Exhibition—The Art Dealers Association of America, Parke-Bernet Galleries, New York, June 18–July 29
Forty-Six Works from New York, Dilexi Gallery, San Francisco, November 12–December 7
 
1964
Art for Art Collectors, Toledo Museum of Art, February 6–March 8
The Painter’s Eye, Betty Parsons Gallery, New York, March 3–28
American Painting III, Cincinnati Art Museum, April 2–28
Seventy-Second Annual Exhibition, Sheldon Memorial Art Gallery, Lincoln, Nebraska, April 8–May 10
Post Painterly Abstraction, Los Angeles County Museum of Art, April 23–June 7; Walker Art Center, Minneapolis, July 13–August 16; Art Gallery of Toronto, November 20–December 20
World House International, 1964, World House Galleries, New York, June 9–September 25
118 Show, Kasmin Gallery, London, July 30– September 19
Color Dynamics, Katonah Gallery, Katonah, New York, September 20–November 3
Paintings and Constructions of the 1960s Selected from the Richard Brown Baker Collection, Museum of Art, Rhode Island School of Design, Providence, October 2–25
American Drawings, Solomon R. Guggenheim Museum, New York, September 17–October 28
 
1964–1965
Dealer’s Choice: An Exhibition of Contemporary Paintings, Drawings, and Prints, Contemporary Arts Museum Houston, December 3, 1964 – January 3, 1965
The Shaped Canvas, Solomon R. Guggenheim Museum, New York, December 5, 1964 – January 31, 1965
 
1965
Optical Painting, Philadelphia Art Alliance, February 17–March 21
Art of the 50s and 60s: Selections from the Richard Brown Baker Collection, Aldrich Museum of Contemporary Art, Ridgefield, Connecticut, April 25–July 5
40 Key Artists of the Mid-20th Century: Paintings and Sculpture, Detroit Institute of Arts, May 4–29
118 Show, Kasmin Gallery, London, August 12– September 18
Artists Against Racialism, Savage Gallery and Cassel Gallery, London, October 7–27
Colorists, 1950–1965, San Francisco Museum of Art, October 15–November 21
25 Paintings ’65, Virginia Museum of Fine Arts, Richmond, June 17–August 31
 
1965–1966
The Responsive Eye, Museum of Modern Art, New York, February 25–April 25, 1965; City Art Museum of St. Louis, May 20–June 20, 1965; Seattle Art Museum, July 15–August 23, 1965; Pasadena Art Museum, September 25–November 27, 1965; Baltimore Museum of Art, December 14, 1965– November 23, 1966
1965 Annual Exhibition of Contemporary American Painting, Whitney Museum of American Art, New York, December 8, 1965–January 30, 1966
Exhibition for the Benefit of the Foundation for Contemporary Performance Art, December 14, 1965–January 30, 1966
 
1966
Multiplicity, Institute of Contemporary Art, Boston, April 16–June 5
Seven Decades, 1895–1966: Crosscurrents in Modern Art, Cordier & Eckstrom, Inc., New York, April 26– May 21
Whence Op, Heckscher Museum of Art, Huntington, New York, May 14–June 26
Systemic Painting, Solomon R. Guggenheim Museum, New York, September 22–November 27
Pattern Art, Betty Parsons Gallery, New York, October 4–29
 
1966–1967
Vormen van de Kleur, Stedelijk Museum, Amsterdam, November 20, 1966–January 15, 1967
 
1967
Formen der Farbe, Württembergischer Kunstverein, Stuttgart, February 2–March 26; Kunsthalle Bern, Bern, April 14–May 21
The 1960s: Painting & Sculpture from the Museum Collection, Museum of Modern Art, New York, June 28–September 24
Seven Decades: A Selection, Solomon R. Guggenheim Museum, July–October
Color, Image, Form, Detroit Institute of Arts, April 11– May 21
Artists/Bennington, Richard Gray Gallery, Chicago, December 6–31
 
1968
Betty Parsons’ Personal Collection, Finch College Museum of Art, New York, March 13–May 29
Opening Exhibition, National Collection of Fine Arts, Washington, DC, May 3–September 1
 
1968–1969
The Art of the Real: USA, 1948–1968, Museum of Modern Art, New York, June 30–September 15, 1968; Grand Palais, Paris, November 14–December 28, 1968; Kunsthaus, Zürich, January 17–February 16, 1969; Tate Gallery, London, April 24–June 1, 1969
 
1971
Recent Acquisitions: American, Museum of Modern Art, New York, February 11–March 11
 
1972
Selections from the Betty Parsons Collection, Montclair Art Museum, New Jersey
 
1974
Drawings Old, Drawings New, Parsons-Truman Gallery, New York, December 3–21
 
1976
Artists at Bennington: Visual Arts Faculty, 1932–1976, Usdan Gallery, Bennington College, Bennington, Vermont, May 20–June 2
 
1984
Art as Personal Relation: The Collection of Lionel and Laura Nowak, Usdan Gallery, Bennington College, Bennington, Vermont, November 20–December 14
 
1987–1988
Fifty Years of Collecting: An Anniversary Selection, Solomon R. Guggenheim Museum, New York, November 13, 1987 – March 13, 1988
 
1988
Made in the Sixties: Painting and Sculpture from the Permanent Collection of the Whitney Museum of American Art, Whitney Museum of American Art, New York, April 18–July 13
 
1991–1992
Stubborn Painting, Now and Then, Max Protech Gallery, New York, December 19, 1991 – January 25, 1992
 
1997
Works on Paper, Lawrence Markey Gallery, New York, September–October
 
1998
The Green Mountain Boys: Caro, Feeley, Noland, and Olitski at Bennington in the 1960s, André Emmerich Gallery, New York, January 8–February 28, 1998; Usdan Gallery, Bennington College, Bennington, Vermont, March 10–April 4
Painting: Now and Forever, Part I, Matthew Marks Gallery, New York, June 25–July 31
 
1999
Shaping a Generation: The Art and Artists of Betty Parsons, Heckscher Museum of Art, Huntington, New York, February 27–April 18
 
2001
Kasmin’s Sixties, Paul Kasmin Gallery, New York, April 26–May 26
Clement Greenberg: A Critic’s Collection, Portland Art Museum, Portland, Oregon, July 14–September 16
Tenth Anniversary Exhibition: 100 Drawings and Photographs, Matthew Marks Gallery, New York, November 3–December 22
 
2008
Painting: Now and Forever, Part II, Matthew Marks Gallery, New York, July 3–August 15
 
2010–2011
Color Fields, Deutsche Guggenheim, Berlin, October 22, 2010 – January 10, 2011
 
2014
Pop Abstraction, Fredericks & Freiser and Garth Greenan Gallery, New York, January 18–February 14
Starting Out: 9 Abstract Painters, 1958–1971, Tibor de Nagy Gallery, New York, June 5–August 1
Contemporary Highlights: Abstraction and Form, Wadsworth Atheneum, Hartford, Connecticut, May 24–October 19
A Drawing Show, Matthew Marks Gallery, October 4–November 29

2014–
Bennington Modernism, Bennington Museum, Vermont, July 2014–
 
2016
The Congregation, Jack Hanley Gallery, New York, September 8–October 9
 
2017
Colour Is, Waddington Custot, London, March 1–April 22

Collections
Feeley's work can be found in prominent collections in America and elsewhere, including the following:
Albright-Knox Art Gallery, Buffalo
Baltimore Museum of Art
Broad Art Museum, Michigan State University, East Lansing
Carnegie Museum of Art, Pittsburgh
Columbus Museum of Art, Ohio
Detroit Institute of Arts
Fogg Museum, Harvard University, Cambridge, Massachusetts
High Museum of Art, Atlanta
Kemper Art Museum, Washington University in St. Louis
Madison Museum of Contemporary Art, Wisconsin
McNay Art Museum, San Antonio
Metropolitan Museum of Art, New York

Museum of Modern Art, New York
National Gallery of Art, Washington, DC
Newark Museum, New Jersey
Neuberger Museum of Art, State University of New York, Purchase
Portland Art Museum, Portland, Oregon
Smithsonian American Art Museum, Washington, DC
Solomon R. Guggenheim Museum, New York
Wadsworth Atheneum, Hartford, Connecticut
Whitney Museum of American Art, New York
Yale University Art Gallery, New Haven, Connecticut

See also
Color Field
List of Bennington College people

References

External links
Paul Feeley website
Paul Feeley at Garth Greenan Gallery
Paul Feeley on Artsy.net
Paul Feeley on Artnet.com

1910 births
1966 deaths
20th-century American painters
American male painters
American contemporary painters
Abstract painters
20th-century American sculptors
20th-century American male artists
American male sculptors
Bennington College faculty
Artists from Des Moines, Iowa
Painters from Iowa
Sculptors from Iowa